Pablo the Little Red Fox is a British pre-school children's animated series which originally ran from 28 September 1999 to 2000 on BBC One and BBC Two (part of CBBC). The hero is a little red fox called Pablo and his siblings called Pumpkin and Poppy, their parents, Red Fox and Rose, their friends, a dog named Baxter, a hedgehog named Helena, a cat named Finbar, a frog called Fromage, a seagull called Gil and an owl named Madam Owl.

Plot
The action often takes place at night, when the three little fox cubs go out and explore the city, from circus tents, artist's studios and the local museum. Pablo often leads them astray but somehow they always get out of trouble and find a way back home, to their cosy den at the bottom of Hannah's garden.

Animation

The graphic style of the cartoons has intense colours and white outlines, reminiscent of silk paintings and Hannah Giffard's original water colour illustrations. The series concept was created by Hannah Giffard, the writer and illustrator of the original books called 'Red Fox' and 'Red Fox on the Move' published by Frances Lincoln. Hannah Giffard worked closely on the series as an editor and creator of many of the story lines. She also worked with the art director and director to create the characters and backgrounds for the series.

Music
The theme music was composed by Rowland Lee, the lyrics were written by John Grace (who was a writer for the show), and was performed by the Clewborough House School in Camberley.

Awards
The show won the British Academy Children's Award for International in 2000.

Telecast
At one point, the US dub of the British show in the same year would be aired on Disney Channel's pre-school block Playhouse Disney (as part of their Mini Movies interstitials) in the U.S. in 2002. When it comes to this particular dub, while a lot of the original UK voices remained intact and some of the characters were re-dubbed to have an American with an American accents in the US dub. The British show has also aired on CBeebies, Nick Jr. and Playhouse Disney in the United Kingdom, Disney Channel in Southeast Asia, ZDF in Germany, Kindernet in the Netherlands, YLE in Finland, MiniMini+ in Poland, NRK in Norway, RTÉ in Ireland, ATV World in Hong Kong, Rai 3 in Italy, and La Cinquième in France. It also aired on ABC Television in Australia from 30 August 2000 to 14 May 2009. It aired briefly between early morning programmes on the Armed Forces Network. It also airs on GMA Network in the Philippines. In Canada, the show is also aired on Treehouse TV. In Ukraine, the show was aired on Malyatko TV, making Ukraine officially the only post-Soviet state to watch the show, in other countries, the show is also aired on Cartoon Network.

Episodes

Original episodes (1999)
 On the Top of the World (28 September 1999)
 The Biggest Bed (5 October 1999)
 Market Day (12 October 1999)
 Gone Hunting (19 October 1999)
 Pumpkin to the Rescue (26 October 1999)
 Fishing for Dad (2 November 1999)
 The Lost Bear (9 November 1999)
 In the Balance (16 November 1999)
 Footprint in the Snow (23 November 1999)
 The Playground (30 November 1999)
 Umbrella Day (7 December 1999)
 At the Supermarket (14 December 1999)
 Moving Out (21 December 1999)
 A New Home for Helena (28 December 1999)
 Bathtime
 The Football Match
 An Ice Day
 Three Wishes
 The Storm
 Me and my Shadow
 Sky High
 Buried Treasure
 Hide and Seek
 The Train Journey
 Pablo the Lifeguard
 Fooled You!
 Snowfox
 Happy Twelve Moons
 Sleepy Head
 Pumpkin Measures Up
 What's This?
 How Does it Grow, Pablo?
 Changing Rooms
 City Lights
 Pumpkin's Big Voice
 The Sound of Music
 Midnight Cleaning
 Rattling Bones
 Painter's Studio
 The Balloon Trip
 A Nest for Four
 Smile!
 Who's the Best?
 Sticky Paws
 The Growling Toy
 The Post-office
 Pablo and the Tin of Sardines
 A Cub in a Tangle
 The Kite (4 September 2000)
 The Abominable Drain Monster (11 September 2000)
 Abracadabra Pablo (18 September 2000)
 The Last Apple (25 September 2000)

Double bill episodes (1999)
These double-bill episodes were originally aired on CBeebies in the United Kingdom from the channel's launch.
 On the Top of the World/The Biggest Bed
 Market Day/Gone Hunting
 Pumpkin to the Rescue/Fishing for Dad
 The Lost Bear/In the Balance
 Footprint in the Snow/The Playground
 Umbrella Day/At the Supermarket
 Moving Out/A New Home for Helena
 Bathtime/The Football Match
 An Ice Day/Three Wishes
 The Storm/Me and my Shadow
 Sky High/Buried Treasure
 Hide and Seek/The Train Journey
 Pablo the Lifeguard/Fooled You!
 Snowfox/Happy Twelve Moons
 Sleepy Head/Pumpkin Measures Up
 What's This?/How Does it Grow, Pablo?
 Changing Rooms/City Lights
 Pumpkin's Big Voice/The Sound of Music
 Midnight Cleaning/Rattling Bones
 Painter's Studio/The Balloon Trip
 A Nest for Four/Smile!
 Who's the Best?/Sticky Paws
 The Growling Toy/The Post-office
 Pablo and the Tin of Sardines/A Cub in a Tangle
 The Kite/The Abominable Drain Monster
 Abracadabra Pablo/The Last Apple

References

External links
 
Official website of Pablo the Little Red Fox

1990s British children's television series
2000s British children's television series
1990s British animated television series
2000s British animated television series
1999 British television series debuts
2000 British television series endings
1990s preschool education television series
2000s preschool education television series
Animated preschool education television series
British children's animated adventure television series
British preschool education television series
British television shows based on children's books
French children's animated adventure television series
French preschool education television series
French television shows based on children's books
English-language television shows
BAFTA winners (television series)
BBC children's television shows
Animated television series about foxes
Animated television series about siblings
Animated television series about children
CBeebies